Pollex may refer to:

 The thumb
 An Ancient Roman unit of measurement, equivalent to approximately 24.6 mm. See also: Uncia (unit)
 Pollex, a genus of moths.

See also
Pollux (disambiguation)